Cloud Nine Movies was an Indian film production and distribution company, based in Chennai. It is owned by Dayanidhi Azhagiri and Vivek Rathinavel and was founded in 2008 until 2014. He founded another new production company in 2013, Meeka Entertainment.

History
The company first distributed the Gautham Vasudev Menon-directed Vaaranam Aayiram in 2008, which was a critical as well as commercial success. Next they produced the parody film Thamizh Padam, which became a box-office hit, too, following which Paiyaa was distributed. The N. Linguswamy-directed romantic-action film, starring Karthi, also went to become highly successful at the box office, emerging one of the highest-grossing Tamil films of that year. Subsequently, their next film was the action-drama film Thoonga Nagaram starring Vimal and Anjali becoming their first production. Simultaneously, they first produced Venkat Prabhu directorial's next film, which stars Ajith Kumar as part of an ensemble cast, but later sold the movie to Studio Green for a whopping price. Later, there was news that they sold the movie to Sun Pictures, and satellite signal also sold to Sun Pictures. But its official now that Cloud Nine Movies and Sun Pictures are presenting it.

Filmography

Production

Distribution

References

Film distributors of India
Mass media companies established in 2008
Film production companies based in Chennai
Film production companies of India
2008 establishments in Tamil Nadu